Arbresha Rexhepi (born 31 October 2000) is a Macedonian judoka.

Career
In 2018 she competed in the XVIII Mediterranean Games (2018 Mediterranean Games)
In 2019 she competed in the 2nd European Games 2019

Currently she is World No 252 in Senior female -52 kg Division of World Ranking List at World Judo List and previously she won bronze medal in the Cadet European Cup.

Achievements

2020 Summer Olympic 
She has qualified after the last qualifying Invitational spots from International Judo Federation (IJF) to represent North Macedonia in Women's 52 kg (Half-lightweight)  at the Judo competition of the 2020 Summer Olympics in Tokyo, Japan.

Tournaments Record

References 

2000 births
Living people
Macedonian female judoka
European Games competitors for North Macedonia
Competitors at the 2018 Mediterranean Games
North Macedonia people
Judoka at the 2020 Summer Olympics
Olympic judoka of North Macedonia
Judoka at the 2019 European Games